The 2005–06 Kazakhstan Hockey Championship was the 14th season of the Kazakhstan Hockey Championship, the top level of ice hockey in Kazakhstan. Six teams participated in the league, and Kazakhmys Karagandy won the championship.

Standings

References
Kazakh Ice Hockey Federation

Kazakhstan Hockey Championship
Kazakhstan Hockey Championship seasons
1